

By country name
A-B •	C-D-E-F •		G-H-I-J-K •	L-M-N-O •	P-Q-R-S •	T-U-V-W-Y-Z

See also

 List of largest cities

Notes

References

Sources
 Population Density, United Nations Statistics Division, accessed 30 August 2010.

External links
 Geopolis: research group, university of Paris-Diderot, France

Towns and cities with 100,000 or more inhabitants
100,000 or more inhabitants